Max Mirnyi and Horia Tecău were the defending champions, but Mirnyi chose not to participate. Tecău successfully defended the title alongside Jean-Julien Rojer, defeating Mariusz Fyrstenberg and Marcin Matkowski in the final, 6–4, 6–4.

Seeds

Draw

Draw

References
 Main Draw

BRD Nastase Tiriac Trophy - Doubles
2014 Doubles